Martin Herzberg (1911-1972) was a German film actor. As a child actor he appeared in over thirty films during the silent and early sound eras. Herzberg was of Jewish heritage.

He retired from films in 1930 at the age of nineteen and later settled in the Canary Islands.

Selected filmography
 David Copperfield (1922)
 Paganini (1923)
 The Hungarian Princess (1923)
 Comedians of Life (1924)
 Carlos and Elisabeth (1924)
 A Free People (1925)
 Students' Love (1927)
 Mary Stuart (1927)
 Band of Thieves (1928)
 The Age of Seventeen (1929)
 The Youths (1929)
 Misled Youth (1929)
 Youthful Indiscretion (1929)
 The Last Company (1930)
 Father and Son (1930)

References

Bibliography 
 Prawer, S.S. Between Two Worlds: The Jewish Presence in German and Austrian Film, 1910-1933. Berghahn Books, 2005.

External links 
 

1911 births
1972 deaths
Canarian Jews
German male film actors
German male silent film actors
German male child actors
20th-century German male actors
Male actors from Berlin
Jewish emigrants from Nazi Germany to Spain
Male actors from the Canary Islands